Technikum or Technicum may refer to:
Technikum (Polish education)
Tekhnikum, middle special education school in Soviet Union, Russia, and some other post-Soviet states
Technicum (German education)
Technikum (Dunaújváros), a district of Dunaújváros, Hungary

See also
Lexicon Technicum
Lititz Watch Technicum